Kim Sum (born Kim Sujin, 23 July 1974) is a South Korean writer, best known as the author of One Left (2016), a novel dealing with the issue of Korean comfort women in the Imperial Japanese Army.

Life
Kim Sum was born in 1974 at a seaside town in Bangeojin, Ulsan, South Korea. When she was six, her father went to the Middle East for a manual labor job, leaving the rest of the family to move into her grandfather's house in Geumsan County, South Chungcheong Province, where she ended up spending her childhood. Upon entering high school, she joined a literature club, the Cheong-un Literary Society, and dabbled in writing poetry. In 1997 she published her first short story, "On Slowness", in the Daejeon Ilbo, which won their New Writer's Award. Kim said she had written the story because she wanted to experiment with longer pieces of writing, rather than just poetry. A year later in 1998 she published another short story, "Time in the Middle Ages", which won the Munhakdongne New Writer Award, and Kim decided to become a writer.

After graduating from university, Kim Sum worked as a proofreader for a newspaper outside of Seoul, and then as an editor for a publishing house for many years.

Career
Kim Sum debuted as a writer when some of her short stories were selected for publications by the Daejeon Ilbo in 1997 and Munhakdongne in 1998. Known for her "elaborate descriptions and aesthetic style" and "vivid allegories", Kim Sum has been a prolific writer since her debut, publishing numerous short story collections and novels. Many of her works, particularly more recent novels such as One Left or L's Sneakers, critically examine modern and contemporary Korean history and related topics, such as Korean independence from Imperial Japan, the Korean War, South Korean democratization, and more. While One Left tells the story of Korean comfort women who were sexually abused by Imperial Japanese soldiers, L's Sneakers retells the story of student activist Lee Han-yeol, whose injuries and later death strongly influenced the June Democratic Struggle of 1987. Both novels focus on more recent historical events that have been critical to forming a national identity amongst South Koreans.

Kim Sum is the recipient of multiple literary recognitions, including the Contemporary Literature (Hyundae Munhak) Award, the Daesan Literary Awards for fiction, the Yi Sang Literary Award, and the Dongri Literature Prize. Several of her works have been translated into other languages, including One Left, which was longlisted for the International Dublin Literary Award in 2022.

Works in Korean
 "On Slowness" (1997)
 "Time in the Middle Ages" (1998)
 Fighting Dog (2005)
 Bed (2007)
 Idiots (2006)
 Iron (2008)
 My Beautiful Sinners (2009)
 Water (2010)
 Liver and Gallbladder (2011)
 To Abandon the Yellow Dog (2011)
 Women and Their Evolving Enemies (2013)
 Noodles (2014)
 Woman Sewing (2015)
 L's Sneakers (2016)
 One Person (2016)
 Your God (2017)
 Flowing Letters (2018)
 Have You Ever Wished for a Soldier To Become an Angel?: The Testimony of Japanese Military "Comfort Woman" Gil Won-ok (2018)
 The Sublime Is Looking into Me: The Testimony of Japanese Military "Comfort Woman" Kim Bok-dong (2018)
 "Divorce"
 "The Night Nobody Comes Back"
 "Disappearing Memories"
 "Hometown Address"
 "Song"
 "That Night with Gyeongsuk"
 "Silent Night, Holy Night"
 "In Search of the Perfect Place"
 "A Day To Go to Okcheon"

Works in translation
 One Left (University of Washington Press, 2020), translated by Bruce Fulton and Ju-Chan Fulton 
 Divorce (Strangers Press, 2019), translated by Emily Yae Won 
 The Night Nobody Returns Home (ASIA Publishers, 2014), translated by Jean Miseli

Awards
 1997: Daejeon Ilbo New Writer’s Award for "On Slowness"
 1998: Munhakdongne New Writer Award for "Time in the Middle Ages"
 2012: 7th Heo Gyun Literary Writer Award for "To Abandon the Yellow Dog"
 2013: Contemporary Literature (Hyundae Munhak) Award for "That Night with Gyeongsuk"
 2013: Daesan Literary Awards for "Women and Their Evolving Enemies".
 2015: Yi Sang Literary Award for "The Story of Roots"

References

Living people
South Korean women novelists
South Korean novelists
People from Ulsan
1974 births